Francesco Renzetti (born 22 January 1988) is an Italian footballer who plays as a left back for  club Modena. At international level, he has represented Italy's youth teams playing for the U15, U17, U20 and U21 teams.

Club career

Genoa
Francesco Renzetti began his career in the Genoa youth system, eventually making one appearance in the first team for Genoa.

Lucchese
He was signed by Lucchese on a temporary basis in January 2006. The club purchased half of the registration rights of Renzetti and Emanuele Volpara for €250,000 each at the end of season.

AlbinoLeffe
Renzetti moved to AlbinoLeffe in a co-ownership deal in 2008, for €750,000 (Genoa acquired Renzetti from Lucchese for €600,000), as part of the deal that Genoa signed the remain 50% registration rights of Gleison Santos (and re-sold to Reggina) for €1M.

Padova
After making 39 appearances for Albinoleffe in Serie B, Renzetti was reacquired by Genoa for just €250,000 and subsequently resold again in co-ownership to Serie B club Padova for €500,000. He was eventually bought in full by Padova for another €1 million.

Cesena
On 12 July 2013 Renzetti joined A.C. Cesena as a free agent. He signed a new contract in January 2016, which would last until 30 June 2019 .

Return to Genoa
On 30 June 2016 Renzetti was re-signed by Genoa for €1.2 million fee. As part of the deal, Giuseppe Panico left for Cesena on loan for 2 seasons. Starting from 2015–16 season, all Serie A clubs required to have 4 club-trained players in their 25-men squad, or else the squad would be forced to be reduced by not using the place for those club-trained players. However, on 31 August Renzetti returned to Cesena in a temporary deal from Genoa. Eventually Genoa only had a 23-men squad (players born 1995 or after were not restricted, such as Giovanni Simeone), as only Mattia Perin and Lukáš Zima were used to fill the quota.

Cremonese
On 12 July 2017, Renzetti was transferred to Cremonese on loan, with an obligation to buy at the end of season. Cremonese fulfilled the obligation and he joined the club on a permanent basis on 1 July 2018.

Chievo
On 28 January 2020, he signed with Chievo until 30 June 2020.

Modena
On 30 June 2021, he joined Modena on a two-year contract.

International career
Renzetti made several appearances representing Italy at various levels of their youth ranks.

Career statistics

Club

References

External links
 FIGC profile 
 AIC profile

1988 births
Living people
People from Monte Carlo
Monegasque people of Italian descent
Italian footballers
Association football fullbacks
Serie A players
Serie B players
Serie C players
Genoa C.F.C. players
S.S.D. Lucchese 1905 players
U.C. AlbinoLeffe players
Calcio Padova players
A.C. Cesena players
U.S. Cremonese players
A.C. ChievoVerona players
Modena F.C. players
Italy under-21 international footballers